Michael Bailey (born 14 February 1948) is a British former swimmer. He competed in two events at the 1972 Summer Olympics.

He also represented England in the 100 metres butterfly, at the 1970 British Commonwealth Games in Edinburgh, Scotland.

References

External links
 

1948 births
Living people
British male swimmers
Olympic swimmers of Great Britain
Swimmers at the 1972 Summer Olympics
Place of birth missing (living people)
Swimmers at the 1970 British Commonwealth Games
Commonwealth Games competitors for England
20th-century British people